In structural biology, a protomer is the structural unit of an oligomeric protein. It is the smallest unit composed of at least two different protein chains that form a larger hetero-oligomer by association of two or more copies of this unit.

The term was introduced by Chetverin to make nomenclature in the Na/K-ATPase enzyme unambiguous. This enzyme is composed of two subunits: a large, catalytic α subunit, and a smaller glycoprotein β subunit (plus a proteolipid, called γ-subunit). At the time it was unclear how many of each work together. In addition, when people spoke of a dimer, it was unclear whether they were referring to αβ or to (αβ)2. Chetverin suggested to call αβ a protomer and (αβ)2 a diprotomer.

Protomers usually arrange in cyclic symmetry to form closed point group symmetries.

In chemistry, a so-called protomer is a molecule which displays tautomerism due to position of a proton.

Examples
Hemoglobin is a heterotetramer consisting of four subunits (two α and two β). However, structurally and functionally hemoglobin is described better as (αβ)2, so we call it a dimer of two αβ-protomers, that is, a diprotomer.

Aspartate carbamoyltransferase has a α6β6 subunit composition. The six αβ-protomers are arranged in D3 symmetry.

Viral capsid are often composed of protomers.

Examples in chemistry include tyrosine and 4-aminobenzoic acid. The former may be deprotonated to form the carboxylate and phenoxide anions, and the later may be protonated at the amino or carboxyl groups.

References

External links

Structural biology
Polymer chemistry